Madre de Dios may refer to:
 Spanish for Mother of God, Christian title for Mary, the mother of Jesus
 Madre de Dios Province, Bolivia
 Madre de Dios Island, Chile
 Madre de Dios Terrane, Chile
 Madre de Dios Mine, Chile
 Madre de Dios Department, Peru
 Madre de Dios River, Peru
 Madre de Dios (album), a 2001 album by Dozer

See also
 Madre de Deus (disambiguation), same title in Portuguese